The 1937 Wayne Tartars football team represented Wayne University (later renamed Wayne State University) as an independent during the 1937 college football season. In their sixth year under head coach Joe Gembis, the Tartars compiled a 6–2 record, shut out four of eight opponents, and outscored all opponents by a combined total of 183 to 77. The coach's younger brother, George Gembis, and Frank "Ace" Cudillo were the stars of the team.

Schedule

References

Wayne
Wayne State Warriors football seasons
Wayne Tartars football